African-American  leftism refers to left-wing political currents that have developed among various African-American communities in the United States of America. These currents are active around social issues, and often call for an African-American led movement that aims at bringing about some form of socialism between the African-American community and White community and other minority groups.

History

Organizations

African Blood Brotherhood
Black Liberation Army
Black Panthers
Black Radical Congress
Black Socialists in America
Coalition of Black Trade Unionists
Detroit Revolutionary Union Movement
League of Revolutionary Black Workers
National Brotherhood of Workers of America
Sojourner Truth Organization
W.E.B. Du Bois Clubs of America
Black Alliance for Peace
Black Youth Project 100 (BYP100)

See also

Civil rights movement (1896–1954)
Afro-Caribbean leftism
The Communist Party USA and African-Americans
Black conservatism in the United States

External links
Seeing Black
Playa Hata "Think, now think again"
Black Commentator
Women of Color Web
NetNoir.com
Black Voices
Black Radical Congress

References 

 
Black Power
Left-wing politics in the United States